Dumriq (also Romanized as Dūmrīq; also known as Domrīq) is a village in Peyghan Chayi Rural District, in the Central District of Kaleybar County, East Azerbaijan Province, Iran. At the 2006 census, its population was 186, in 40 families.

References 

Populated places in Kaleybar County